Till rolls are paper rolls for use in cash registers and Electronic Point of Sale printers. There are a number of different types available, including:
Thermal: One side of the paper has a special coating that is heat sensitive.
2 & 3 ply: These rolls require an impact printer and produce multiple copies

Retailing equipment and supplies
Retail point of sale systems